Pechatniki is a railway station of Line D2 and planned D5 of the Moscow Central Diameters in Moscow. The construction project has been approved in June 2020. The station is opened on 10 June 2022. There is a transfer to both eponymous metro stations.

Gallery

References

Railway stations in Moscow
Railway stations of Moscow Railway
Line D2 (Moscow Central Diameters) stations
Railway stations under construction in Russia